Goran Vujanović (born 15 November 1977 in Croatia) is a Croatian retired footballer.

Career

Brunei

Completing a hat-trick as DPMM cruised past Bandaran KB 9-0, Vujanovic was considered to be the Wasps mercurial talent at the 2005 ASEAN Club Championship. He struck twice to reach the semifinals where they were eliminated by Pahang FA. However, the Croat's contract was not renewed, with DPMM officials citing underperformance.

Puerto Rico

He was an import to Puerto Rico Islanders halfway through 2007.

References

External links
 Soccerstats.us Profile
 

1977 births
Living people
Association football forwards
Croatian footballers
Croatia youth international footballers
Croatia under-21 international footballers
HNK Rijeka players
NK Pomorac 1921 players
HNK Orijent players
NK Novalja players
DPMM FC players
Puerto Rico Islanders players
NK Imotski players
USL First Division players
Croatian expatriate footballers
Expatriate footballers in Brunei
Croatian expatriate sportspeople in Brunei
Expatriate soccer players in the United States
Croatian expatriate sportspeople in the United States
Expatriate footballers in Puerto Rico